John Gastev (previously John Gastevich, born 11 August 1964) is a former Australian rules footballer who played in the VFL/AFL.

A cult figure and "crowd favourite" standing at only  and weighing just , Gastev began with West Perth in 1983. However, Gastev's career did not take off until 1985 when he gave up a career as an engraver to concentrate upon football full-time and became a mainstay for the Falcons before debuting with the West Coast Eagles in their inaugural season. After only two seasons and 30 games, Gastev was dumped and joined the Brisbane Bears for 1989. Gastev's main roles were as a tagger, though he occasionally played as a forward in his early years. In an upset win over the Sydney Swans early in 1989, Gastev kicked seven goals after half-time, a feat made more remarkable by the fact that he kicked no other goal in the first thirteen rounds of 1989. In this first year at the Bears he won the best and fairest, repeating the feat in 1992.

After 1990, Gastev played chiefly in defence, and his career was ended when he suffered a major hit at the hands of Gary Ablett in a match in 1994 at Kardinia Park. Gastev announced his retirement during the off-season, despite being only thirty years old.

His other honours include playing for Western Australia in state of origin.

References

External links

Brisbane Bears players
West Coast Eagles players
1964 births
Living people
Sportsmen from Western Australia
West Perth Football Club players
Western Australian State of Origin players
Brisbane Bears Club Champion winners
Australian rules footballers from Perth, Western Australia
Australia international rules football team players